Greer's tree skink (Epibator greeri) is a species of lizard in the family Scincidae. It is found in New Caledonia.

References

Epibator
Skinks of New Caledonia
Endemic fauna of New Caledonia
Reptiles described in 1979
Taxa named by Wolfgang Böhme (herpetologist)